Leo Patrick Kiely (November 30, 1929 – January 18, 1984) was an American pitcher in Major League Baseball who played between 1951 and 1960 for the Boston Red Sox (1951, 1954–56, 1958–59) and Kansas City Athletics (1960). He was born in Hoboken, New Jersey.

Kiely entered the majors in the 1951 midseason with the Red Sox. He finished with a 7–7 record and a 3.34 ERA in 16 starts before joining the military during Korean War. In 1953, he pitched for the Mainichi Orions of the Pacific League to become the first major leaguer to play in Japanese baseball, while going 6–0 with a 1.80 ERA for Mainichi. He returned to Boston in 1954.

In 1957 Kiely was demoted to Triple-A. He finished with a 21–6 record and a 2.22 ERA for the PCL San Francisco Seals, leading the league in wins. 20 of them came in relief, including 14 in consecutive games, to set two PCL records. The 1958 TSN Guide also credited Kiely with 11 saves during the 14-game winning streak.

Kiely led the Red Sox with 12 saves in 1958, while going 5–2 with a 3.00 ERA in 47 relief appearances. He also pitched with the Athletics in 1960, his last major league season.

In a seven-season career, Kiely posted a 26–27 record with a 3.37 ERA in 209 games, including 39 starts, eight complete games, one shutout, 29 saves, and 523.0 innings of work. He went 63–36 during his minor league career.
 
Kiely died from cancer in Montclair, New Jersey at age 54.

External links

Baseball Library

Japan Baseball Daily

1929 births
1984 deaths
American expatriate baseball players in Japan
American military personnel of the Korean War
Baseball players from New Jersey
Birmingham Barons players
Boston Red Sox players
Deaths from cancer in New Jersey
Kansas City Athletics players
Louisville Colonels (minor league) players
Mainichi Orions players
Major League Baseball pitchers
San Francisco Seals (baseball) players
Scranton Red Sox players
Sportspeople from Hoboken, New Jersey
Wellsville Nitros players